Coathanga Strangla is the 7th studio album from Brotha Lynch Hung. It was released on April 5, 2011. It is the second album released through Strange Music, and second album of the Coathanga Strangla concept trilogy. On February 21 the first song "Mannibalector" was released on the Brotha Lynch Hung Blog. On March 4 the single "Spit It Out" was released. On March 9 the single and video "Coathanga" was released.

Commercial performance 
Coathanga Strangla debuted at number 68 on the US Billboard 200, with approximately 7,300 units sold in the first week. As of April 2011, the album has sold 10,000 copies in the United States.

Track listing

References

2011 albums
Brotha Lynch Hung albums
Albums produced by Seven (record producer)
Concept albums
Strange Music albums
Rap operas